Bois Blanc Township is a civil township of Mackinac County in the U.S. state of Michigan. As of the 2020 census, the population was 63.  The township occupies Bois Blanc Island, as well as some smaller outlying islands within Lake Huron.  The nearby Round Island is administered by the city of Mackinac Island.

The township is served by Bois Blanc Pines School District, which is the smallest school district in terms of enrollment in the state of Michigan and among the nation.  The district had an enrollment of four students for the 2021–22 school year.

Communities
Bois Blanc Island is a historic settlement on the island. Its native name of Mikobiminiss means "white wood" from the simple French translation, and the township would later share the same name.  A post office name Bois Blanc began operating on the island on December 12, 1884.  It was closed from June 19, 1886 until June 15, 1888; it was respelled as Boisblanc on October 19, 1895.       
The plat of this resort community was recorded in 1888 by the Bois Blanc Island Land Company of Jackson. The Pointe Aux Pins post office was established on May 15, 1889. It was briefly closed from October 25, 1889 until being restored on May 29, 1890. The name comes from French translation for its location in the pine forest area. The Pointe Aux Pins post office uses the 49775 ZIP Code that serves an area conterminous with the township. It is the only post office for the township, while the name Bois Blanc Island can also be used for mail delivery.
Sand Bay is a former lumber settlement developed around a sawmill and general store operated by the E. H. Stafford Manufacturing Company.  A post office in Sand Bay began operating on November 12, 1909 but has long been disestablished.

History

"Bois Blanc" is French for "white wood". The name is commonly thought to be a reference to either: (a) the paper birch, or more likely (b) the basswood, called "bois blanc" in other contexts. The basswood's white underbark was extensively used by Native Americans and French-speaking fur traders for cordage, including the sewing up of canoes and the manufacture of webbing for snowshoes.

Bois Blanc was ceded by the local Anishinaabe (Chippewa) to the U.S. federal government with the Treaty of Greenville in 1795. After extensive use as a source of kilned lime and firewood for Mackinac Island and other local frontier settlements, Bois Blanc was settled in the late 1800s as a summer resort community. The Bois Blanc Light lighthouse (1867) survives on the northern shore of the island; it is no longer in service as a lighthouse and is not open to the public.

Transportation
The sparsely populated township contains no paved roads.  A maintained county road extends from the island's northeast corner to the far western tip.  There are numerous unmaintained roads and trails.  Commercial access to the island is provided by ferry connections with Cheboygan through a dock at Pointe aux Pins. The township is also served by a paved airstrip, Bois Blanc Island Airport, in the interior of the island with facilities for private planes.

Geography

The township is located on the eastern end of the Straits of Mackinac directly north of the city of Cheboyan.  It is politically and geographically part of the state's Upper Peninsula.  While the rest of the Upper Peninsula uses the area code 906, Bois Blanc Township is the only municipality in the Upper Peninsula that uses the area code 231.  Bois Blanc Township is one of only seven municipalities in the state of Michigan to consist entirely of islands, including Grosse Ile Township, Drummond Township, St. James Township, Mackinac Island, Peaine Township, and Sugar Island Township.

The township should not be confused with another Bois Blanc Island, which is a Canadian island in the Detroit River much further to the south.  That island is also nicknamed "Boblo."

Demographics

As of the census of 2000, there were 71 people, 42 households, and 17 families residing in the township. The population density was 2.0 per square mile (0.8/km2). There were 420 housing units at an average density of 11.9 per square mile (4.6/km2). The racial makeup of the township was 100.00% White. However, about 2,000 people visit the island. Only about 71 people stay year-round.

There were 42 households, out of which 7.1% had children under the age of 18 living with them, 35.7% were married couples living together, 2.4% had a female householder with no husband present, and 59.5% were non-families. 47.6% of all households were made up of individuals, and 11.9% had someone living alone who was 65 years of age or older. The average household size was 1.69 and the average family size was 2.41.

In the township the population was spread out, with 7.0% under the age of 18, 2.8% from 18 to 24, 11.3% from 25 to 44, 56.3% from 45 to 64, and 22.5% who were 65 years of age or older. The median age was 57 years. For every 100 females, there were 102.9 males. For every 100 females age 18 and over, there were 106.3 males.

The median income for a household in the township was $40,833, and the median income for a family was $46,250. Males had a median income of $23,750 versus $0 for females. The per capita income for the township was $27,131. There were no families and 3.8% of the population living below the poverty line, including no under eighteens and 14.3% of those over 64.

References

Sources

Townships in Mackinac County, Michigan
Townships in Michigan
Populated places on Lake Huron in the United States
Populated places established in 1895
1895 establishments in Michigan